Gung Ho is an American sitcom based on the 1986 film of the same name. The series aired for one season on ABC from December 5, 1986 to February 9, 1987.

Synopsis
Just like in the movie, the TV series follows the exploits of Hunt Stevenson (here, played by Scott Bakula as opposed to Michael Keaton in the movie), a laid-back American employee liaison of a Japanese car company (Assan Motors) in the fictional city of Hadleyville, Pennsylvania. Much of the humor arises from the abounding clashes between Hunt and the new Japanese plant manager, Kaz Kazuhiro (Gedde Watanabe, reprising his role from the movie) while looking for ways to bridge the culture gap between one another.

Cast
Besides Watanabe, many of the other Japanese actors from the movie also reprised their roles for the series. Clint Howard (brother of Gung Ho movie director Ron Howard) was the only Caucasian actor from the film to also appear in the TV series.

Scott Atari as Kenji
Scott Bakula as Hunt Stevenson
Heidi Banks as Randi
Clint Howard as Googie 
Rodney Kageyama as Ito 
Stephen Lee as Buster  
Gedde Watanabe as Kaz Kazuhiro 
Patti Yasutake as Umeki Kazuhiro
Sab Shimono as Saito
Mary-Margaret Humes as Melissa
Wendy Schaal As Kelly
Kenneth Kimmins as Wacky Wally
Emily Kuroda as Yukiko

Episodes

See also
 1986–87 United States network television schedule

References

External links 
 

1980s American sitcoms
1980s American workplace comedy television series
1986 American television series debuts
1987 American television series endings
American Broadcasting Company original programming
Asian-American television
Live action television shows based on films
Television shows set in Pennsylvania
Television series by CBS Studios
Television series by Imagine Entertainment